The  Philadelphia Eagles season was the franchise's 57th season in the National Football League (NFL).

This season marked the Eagles’ second consecutive appearance in the postseason, this time as a wild-card team.

However, tribulation struck the Eagles late in the season with the death of quarterbacks coach Doug Scovil from a heart attack. For the remainder of the season, the Eagles wore a black stripe made of electrical tape over the wings on their helmet in tribute.

It was Hall of Famer Cris Carter's final season in Philadelphia as his on-and-off the field troubles led to his release the following preseason. He would then sign with the Minnesota Vikings.

Offseason

Draft

Personnel

Staff

Roster

Regular season
Randall Cunningham enjoyed the second of back-to-back breakout seasons, beginning with his leading the Eagles to a 42–37 comeback victory at RFK Stadium on September 17, right after signing a contract extension.

The Eagles won five of their last six games to challenge the Giants for the division lead. On Thanksgiving Day at Texas Stadium, Philly spanked the Cowboys, 27–0, amidst accusations that certain defensive players were rewarded with bounties to take out several Dallas players, including kicker Luis Zendejas. Less than two weeks later, back in Philadelphia, Eagles fans pelted the Cowboys and game officials with snowballs packed in ice thanks to freezing temperatures and snowfall from the previous day.

The two matchups between the Cowboys and Eagles became known as the Bounty Bowls.

Schedule

Note: Intra-division opponents are in bold text.

Game summaries

Week 1

Week 2

Week 3

Week 4

Week 5

Week 6

Week 7

Week 8

Week 9

Week 10

Week 11

Week 12 at Cowboys

"The Bounty Bowl"

Reggie White won the Turkey Leg Award

Week 13

Week 14

Week 15

Week 16

Standings

Postseason

The Los Angeles Rams, ignoring the weather, the fans, and the Eagles mighty defense, rode a quick start to defeat the Eagles at Veterans Stadium, 21–7 on New Year's Eve, 1989. The Eagles came into their first home playoff game in 8 seasons against the Los Angeles Rams with injury concerns.  Several players came limping into the game, but perhaps the most concerning injury was that of Eric Allen, whose ankle had been injured a few weeks prior. Allen was an outstanding cover corner and without him, the Eagles would be forced to start reserve cornerback Izel Jenkins. The Rams at the time had a potent and versatile offense, especially in the passing game. Quarterback Jim Everett, running back Greg Bell and wideouts Henry Ellard and Willie "Flipper" Anderson rounded out the Rams offense. However, none of this seemed to concern head coach Buddy Ryan, who reportedly was asked the week leading up the game his impression of Rams running back Greg Bell. Ryan gave a curious vanilla answer to the reporter then turned and walked away saying, "Greg Bell my ass." Most of the media that had gathered exploded in laughter.

Eric Allen, as it turned out, did not start the game, which was played on an overcast, drizzly New Year's Eve. The Rams immediately attacked Allen's replacement, cornerback Izel Jenkins.  Jenkins was burned on the Rams first touchdown; a 39-yard touchdown pass from Jim Everett to Henry Ellard on the Rams first possession. Jenkins was again burned for another long pass, this time to Willie Anderson and by midway through the second quarter, head coach Buddy Ryan had all but no choice to insert the limping Allen with the Rams already leading 14–0.

The Eagles offense, led by All-Pro quarterback Randall Cunningham had no answers for a unique zone implemented by Rams defensive coordinator Fritz Shurmer, who at times during the game only rushed two defenders and dropped everything back in coverage. Cunningham, while completing 24 of 40 pass, only threw underneath the zone for the majority of the game and simply was unable to get anything downfield. It certainly did not help matters not having All-Pro receiver Mike Quick unable to play due to a season-ending injury earlier in the year. The Eagles had less than 100 yards of offense at halftime, and did not have a single first down till midway through the second quarter. The Eagles first four possessions where three (3) three and outs and an interception. When the Eagles finally did score on a one-yard Anthony Toney touchdown plunge to make the game 14–7 with just under 11 minutes to go, there was hope. The Eagles defense, after their shaky start, had by and large held the Rams in check. Indeed, after the Eagles only touchdown of the afternoon, the Eagles defense held the Rams twice and gave the Eagles good field position on their next two possessions, which began at their own 31- and 40-yard lines. However, the Eagles would manage just one first down on those two possessions.

The Rams finally put the nail in the coffin with just under three minutes left, when Greg Bell ran for a 7-yard touchdown for the final score of 21–7. This touchdown run came a few plays after Bell ran 54 yards down to the 10-yard line. The Eagles defense, especially the front four, had finally collapsed after keeping the Rams in check for so long during the game.

Statistics

Defense

Offense

Passing
Note: Comp = Completions; ATT = Attempts; TD = Touchdowns; INT = Interceptions

Receiving
Note: ATT = Attempts; TD = Touchdowns; INT = Interceptions

Rushing
Note: ATT = Attempts; TD = Touchdowns; INT = Interceptions

Special teams

Kick returns

Punt returns

Kicking
Note: FGA = Field goals attempted; FGM = Field goals made; FG% = Field goal percentage; XPA = Extra points attempted; XPM = Extra points made; XP% = Extra points percentage

Punting

Awards and honors
Keith Byars, Led all NFL running backs in receiving yardage
Keith Jackson, Pro Bowl selection

References

External links
 1989 Philadelphia Eagles at Pro-Football-Reference.com

Philadelphia Eagles seasons
Philadelphia Eagles
Philadelphia Eagles